Slovenia was represented at the 2009 World Championships in Athletics from 15–23 August in Berlin by 13 athletes.

Primož Kozmus won the gold medal in men's hammer throw, defending his 2008 Summer Olympics title and achieving the biggest success of Slovenian athletes in the history of World Championships.

References

External links
Official competition website

Nations at the 2009 World Championships in Athletics
World Championships in Athletics
Slovenia at the World Championships in Athletics